The Communauté de communes de la Vallée d'Auge is a former communauté de communes in the Calvados département and in the Normandy région of France. It was created in January 2002. It was merged into the new Communauté d'agglomération Lisieux Normandie in January 2017.

Composition 
This Communauté de communes comprised 20 communes:

 Les Authieux-Papion
 Biéville-Quétiéville
 Bissières
 Castillon-en-Auge
 Condé-sur-Ifs
 Coupesarte
 Crèvecœur-en-Auge
 Croissanville
 Grandchamp-le-Château
 Lécaude
 Magny-la-Campagne
 Magny-le-Freule
 Méry-Corbon
 Le Mesnil-Mauger
 Mézidon-Canon
 Monteille
 Percy-en-Auge
 Saint-Julien-le-Faucon
 Saint-Loup-de-Fribois
 Vieux-Fumé

See also 
Communes of the Calvados department

References 

Vallee d'Auge